CYFS may refer to:

 CYFS - New Zealand Department of Child, Youth and Family Services.
 CYOA - Fort Simpson Airport in the Northwest Territories.